The 2008 Individual Speedway Junior Polish Championship is the 2009 version of Individual Speedway Junior Polish Championship organized by the Polish Motor Union (PZM). The Final took place on 7 August 2009 at Alfred Smoczyk Stadium in Leszno. The Championships was won by Patryk Dudek who beat Sławomir Musielak and Dawid Lampart. The defending Champion, Maciej Janowski, finished eighth.

Qualifying rounds

Final 
 The Final
 7 August 2009
 Leszno, Alfred Smoczyk Stadium
 Referee: Leszek Demski

Heat details

See also 
 2009 Team Speedway Junior Polish Championship
 2009 Individual Speedway Polish Championship

References 

Individual Junior